WAVR (102.1 FM) and WATS (960 AM) are a pair of radio stations simulcasting an Adult Contemporary format. The stations serve Bradford County, Pennsylvania and Tioga County, New York, located in the Twin Tiers between Elmira and Binghamton. The station is currently owned by Dave Radigan's WATS UP, LLC. The station features a local morning program hosted by Chuck Carver and Todd Bowers called "Chuck and Todd Live" and programming from AP Radio and Jones Radio Network.

In October 2020, WATS Broadcasting, Inc. (a corporation owned by Carver, Bowers, and Larry Brown) agreed to sell WATS and WAVR to Dave Radigan, the owner of WEBO, a similarly formatted station in Owego. The sale, at a price of $450,000, was consummated on January 7, 2021.

WATS is licensed to Sayre, Pennsylvania and WAVR is licensed to Waverly, Tioga County, New York; the two towns are adjacent to each other and are located on opposite sides of Interstate 86 and New York-Pennsylvania border. The two stations are headquartered in Sayre.

Stations

References

External links

AVR
Radio stations established in 1950